WHD may refer to:
 World Health Day, a public health education day designated by the World Health Organization.
 Wafer Handling Diffusion, a machine used to load/unload solar wafers into/from a diffusion furnace.
 West Hampstead railway station, London, National Rail station code.
 World Humanitarian Day, a day designated by the United Nation.
 Wage and Hour Division, a division of the United States Department of Labor.
 WHD-TV, a defunct experimental digital television station.
 Werdnig–Hoffmann disease, an infantile-onset type of spinal muscular atrophy.